Knezevich Rock is a rock outcrop on the lower part of the north slope of Mount Takahe in Marie Byrd Land, Antarctica. It lies at the east side of the mouth of Clausen Glacier. The rock was mapped by the United States Geological Survey from surveys and U.S. Navy aerial photography, 1959–66, and was named by the Advisory Committee on Antarctic Names for Nick Knezevich, Jr., U.S. Navy, an electronics technician at South Pole Station, 1974.

References

Rock formations of Marie Byrd Land